Lumos, formerly known as Children's High Level Group and briefly as The Children's Voice, is an international non-governmental charity (NGO) founded by the author of the Harry Potter book series, J. K. Rowling. Lumos promotes an end to the institutionalisation of children worldwide.

History

In 2004, Rowling read an article in The Sunday Times about children with disabilities who were placed in cage beds. She and Emma Nicholson co-founded the Children's High Level Group (CHLG) in 2005. CHLG was briefly renamed The Children's Voice, but then changed back to its original name because "The Children's Voice" was trademarked in the US. It became Lumos, after a spell in Harry Potter, in 2010. Rowling stood down as a trustee in 2013 but continued as the charity's president.

Lumos and other organisations have worked to encourage the European Commission to establish regulations that state that funding to EU member states must be used for community services, not to build or renovate residential institutions. Even before the regulations were passed, as a result of years of advocacy and awareness-raising, this principle of funding supporting 'deinstitutionalization' (DI) had already helped divert more than €367 million of EU funding away from institutions towards community services.

Governance and people
Georgette Mulheir stepped down as CEO in 2020 after trustees identified "management and cultural challenges" and commissioned independent reviews into governance and culture. The charity has received 19 reviews on the employee ratings website, Glassdoor, and has an overall score of 2.4 out of 5.

Peter McDermott joined as CEO in June 2021 succeeding Interim CEO, Sir Roger Singleton.

Carol Copland is the Chair of the Board of Trustees. Other trustees include: Billy DiMichele (Senior Vice President of Scholastic), Tanya Motie, Neena Gill CBE, Nick Pasricha, Dr Doreen Mulenga, Kate Wills, Jimmy Paul and Usman Ali.

The Lumos Foundation USA Board is headed by Billy DiMichele as chairman, other members are Leslie Little who serves as Treasurer and Liz Robbins.

References

Works cited

External links
 

Children's charities based in the United Kingdom
Child welfare in the United Kingdom
Charities based in England
Organizations established in 2005
2005 establishments in England
2005 establishments in the United Kingdom